Clematoessa is a genus of moths of the Zygaenidae family.

Species
 Clematoessa xuthomelas Jordan, 1915

References
 Clematoessa at Markku Savela's Lepidoptera and Some Other Life Forms

Chalcosiinae
Zygaenidae genera